Acianthera klotzschiana is a species of orchid. 

klotzschiana